Gareth Mark Davies (born 31 March 1984) is a British Conservative Party politician. He has been the Member of Parliament (MP) for the constituency of Grantham and Stamford since the 2019 general election.

Early life
Davies was born in Leeds, West Yorkshire. His mother and father were a state primary school teacher and a small business owner respectively. He attended a state comprehensive school before completing his undergraduate studies at the University of Nottingham, where he studied Politics and graduated with a 2:1 in 2006. He completed an Master's of Public Administration at the John F. Kennedy School of Government at Harvard University in 2016, during which time he visited North Korea on a study visit.

Business career
Davies began working in the investment industry in 2006. He worked at Columbia Threadneedle Investments for 14 years, rising to become the firm's head of responsible investment solutions.

Political career
Davies worked for the Conservative Party on a voluntary basis before entering parliament. He twice stood unsuccessfully as a parliamentary candidate for Doncaster Central in 2010 and Leeds Central in 2017.

Ahead of the 2019 general election, he was selected as the prospective Conservative candidate for Grantham and Stamford to replace then former Conservative and then independent Member of Parliament, Nick Boles. Davies was elected with a majority of 46.4%.

He is a member of the Inter-Parliamentary Alliance on China.

References

External links

1984 births
Living people
Conservative Party (UK) MPs for English constituencies
Politics of Grantham
UK MPs 2019–present
Harvard Kennedy School alumni